The Old White Mill, also known as Sterling Mill and Pinnock Mill, is a historic grist mill located at Meshoppen, Wyoming County, Pennsylvania. It was built in 1852, and is a 5 1/2-story, banked frame structure.  It measures , sits on a stone foundation, and has a gable roof.  It contains original milling equipment.

It was added to the National Register of Historic Places in 1975.

References

Grinding mills on the National Register of Historic Places in Pennsylvania
Industrial buildings completed in 1852
Buildings and structures in Wyoming County, Pennsylvania
Grinding mills in Pennsylvania
1852 establishments in Pennsylvania
National Register of Historic Places in Wyoming County, Pennsylvania